Acartauchenius scurrilis is a species of sheet weaver found in the Palearctic. It was described by O.P.-Cambridge in 1872.

References

Linyphiidae
Spiders described in 1872
Palearctic flora